Pentti Gunnar Forsman (1 August 1917 – 24 January 2006) was a tennis player from Finland.

Tennis career
Forsman represented Finland from 1950 to 1953 in the Davis Cup competition. He made his Davis Cup debut during the 1950 Europe Zone first round tie against Belgium. During his Davis Cup career, Forsman played in ten Davis Cup singles rubbers and in five doubles rubbers, with one victory in each.

Forsman participated at the 1949 Wimbledon Championships playing in the singles and doubles, teaming up with Sakari Salo in the doubles.

See also
List of Finland Davis Cup team representatives

References

External links
 
 
 

1917 births
2006 deaths
Finnish male tennis players
Sportspeople from Turku